In a World Like This is the eighth studio album (seventh in the US) by the Backstreet Boys. It was released on July 30, 2013, through the group's own K-BAHN record label, under license to BMG Rights Management, and distributed by RED Distribution. A follow-up to This Is Us (2009), it is the first album since Never Gone (2005) to feature Kevin Richardson, who left the group in 2006 and rejoined in 2012. It was also their first and only independent album since leaving their old label Jive Records in 2010. The album debuted at number five on the US Billboard 200, making the Backstreet Boys the first act since Sade to have nine US top 10 albums, and the only boy band to do so.

On May 20, 2013, the group released "Permanent Stain" as a promotional single, which was co-written by band member Nick Carter. A free download of the song was offered with the purchase of a ticket for their In a World Like This Tour. The first single from the album, also titled "In a World Like This" premiered on Z100 New York on June 18, 2013 and was released on June 25, 2013.

Background and recording
On May 25, 2010, Backstreet Boys, still a quartet without Kevin Richardson at the time, left their long-time label, Jive Records. The group then was looking to sign with Interscope Records, but the members couldn't agree on whether to take a one-album deal or a three-album deal. In June 2010, Nick Carter revealed that they had started working on new material for the next album, and Brian Littrell said in a separate interview that they were planning to release the album in early 2011. However, in late 2010 they teamed up with New Kids On The Block for a joint tour called NKOTBSB, planned for 2011, so they had to push back the release of the album as they had to find time to work on the album in between tour dates. In March 2011, during a press conference in Vietnam, the band stated that for the first time ever they have full creative control because they were no longer with Jive.

In November 2011, after the US leg of NKOTBSB tour ended, Carter said in an interview that they were hoping to get a single out in spring 2012 and the album in summer 2012. However, Carter's sister Leslie's unexpected death at the end of January 2012 made the group once again postpone the recording until the end of February 2012 to give him time to cope with his loss. Howie Dorough stated later that month that they would not rush the album and that they would try to release the album in 2012 or 2013 at the latest.

In April 2012, a week before the European leg of NKOTBSB tour started, the group, along with original member Kevin Richardson, went to London to meet with producer Martin Terefe and to write some songs. On April 29, 2012, the group announced that Richardson had rejoined them permanently and in July 2012, all five members moved into a house together all by themselves in London to work on the new album. Besides Terefe, they also wrote songs with Sacha Skarbek and Craig David while in London, and in the US they worked with Morgan Taylor Reid, Mika Guillory, GoodWill & MGI, Lucas Hilbert, Geo Slam, and Porcelain Black. On July 27, 2012 the group held a lottery for fans to win a chance to hear rough mixes of their new album at their studio in London.

On April 20, 2013, during their 20th anniversary celebration event, the group previewed eight new songs, "Soldier", "In Your Arms", "Show 'Em (What You're Made Of)", "Trust Me", "Permanent Stain", "Hot, Hot, Hot", "Try", and "Breathe". The following day, they posted a video containing the previews of six of the new songs on their YouTube channel. On May 15, 2013, the group performed a song from the new album, "Permanent Stain",  for the very first time on Good Morning America. While on GMA they also announced that the purchase of each ticket for their In a World Like This Tour would include a free download of "Permanent Stain". They released a lyric video of the song on their YouTube Channel the following day.

Writing and musical style
In July 2012, Richardson stated in an interview that the album will be authentic and personal, and that they were hoping Terefe would produce the entire record. They also wrote a lot on it and a lot of the songs were based on their own life experiences. Carter said that the band didn't want to make a traditional boy band album and record songs that they didn't write themselves. Richardson also revealed that he wrote a song about his son. "We want it to be a personal album about what's happening in our lives now. A.J. is getting ready to be a father. Howie, Brian and myself are fathers already. So we’re just trying to make it a personal record."

In an interview with Clizbeats, Carter talked about reinvention and drastic changes and he said that he didn't feel that the group were at that point anymore. The album itself is a mixture of modern pop, adult contemporary, and dance music, with a hint of singer/songwriter genre as demonstrated on "Try", "Madeleine", and "Trust Me".

Singles
 "In a World Like This" was released as the album's lead single on June 25, 2013.
"Show 'Em (What You're Made Of)" was released as the second worldwide single on November 18, 2013. The music video was filmed in October 2013 and released on November 19, 2013.

Tour

The album was supported by the In a World Like This Tour, which started on May 24, 2013 in China and finished on June 28, 2015. The tour consists of over 150 shows in 11 legs worldwide so far.

Critical reception

In a World Like This received mixed to positive reviews from music critics. At Metacritic, which assigns a normalized rating out of 100 to reviews from mainstream critics, the album received an average score of 60, which indicates "generally favorable reviews", based on 11 reviews.

Stephen Thomas Erlewine of AllMusic found it "far more interesting" sonically than the two last albums and stated, "In a World Like This is a surprisingly mature and fine record from a former boy band that seems unafraid to act its age." MUZU.TV's Pip Ellwood opined that In a World Like This finds Backstreet Boys continuing to mature with their sound. The album's title track sees the group working once again with long-time collaborator Max Martin. The track keeps Backstreet Boys’ sensibilities allowing their strong harmonies to come to the fore on the chorus and giving each of the individual members vocal parts. Musically the song is an acoustic-driven mid-tempo number that is recognisable as them but different from anything they’ve done before.

In a mixed review, Caroline Sullivan of The Guardian opined that their last record, released 2009, recreated the dancepop of their golden era; this time, perhaps goaded by fear of looking foolish, they've abandoned the beats for mid-tempo adult pop.

Commercial performance
In a World Like This was first released in Japan on July 24, 2013 where it debuted and peaked at number one with 40,000 copies in its first week. It became the best-selling western album of that week. However, the album stood as a far cry from their previous release This Is Us, which debuted at No.2 with 98,000 copies sold.

On July 30, 2013, the album was released in the United States, it debuted and peaked at number five on the US Billboard 200 the week of August 17, 2013, selling 48,000 copies in its first week. The album, which was the first to be independently released by the group, was their highest-charting set since 2005's Never Gone debuted and peaked at number three. The album also peaked at number 3 on the Independent Albums Chart and  #7 on the Digital Albums Chart.

The album was subsequently released in most other countries in August 2013 and reached number one in the Netherlands, Switzerland, Taiwan, and Japan International Chart. It entered the top 5 in the U.S, Japan, Canada, Germany, and Spain, and the top 10 in Austria and Norway. In Canada, it is their 9th consecutive album that peaked at Top 3. In December 2013, it was released in China where it peaked at number three. 
In March 2014, it was released in France and entered French SNEP Albums Chart at number 144.

Track listing
The official track listing was posted on the group's official site on June 17, 2013.

Notes
  signifies an additional producer
  signifies a vocal producer

Credits
Credits adapted from album’s liner notes. The track numbers correspond to the Hong Kong, Taiwan, China, Mexico and Target special editions.

Backstreet Boys
 Nick Carter
 Howie Dorough
 Brian Littrell
 AJ McLean
 Kevin Richardson

Additional personnel

 Nathaniel Alford - assistant engineer (tracks 6, 11)
 David Angell - violin (track 3)
 Cory Bice - assistant engineer (track 1)
 James Bryan - additional production, engineer, acoustic guitar, and programming (track 7)
 Jon Castelli - mixing (tracks 2-14)
 Fernando Castillo - trumpet (track 8)
 John Catchings - cello (track 3)
 Adam Cole - engineer (track 3), assistant engineer (track 8)
 Tom Coyne - mastering
 David Davidson - violin and string arrangements (track 3)
 Brian Frederick - assistant engineer (tracks 6, 11)
 Serban Ghenea - mixing (track 1)
 Franny Graham - engineer (track 9)
 Grooveline Horns - horns and horns engineers (track 8)
 John Hanes - mix engineer (track 1)
 Sam Holland - engineer (track 1)
 Jordan Keller - additional background vocals (track 11)
 Sam Keyte - engineer (tracks 3, 4, 7, 8), programming (tracks 3, 8)
 Adam Lester - electric and acoustic guitars (tracks 6, 11)
 Tomas Ljung - handclaps (track 1)
 Kristian Lundin - producer, keyboards, and programming (track 1)
 Jaakko Manninen - producer, instruments, and programming (track 9)
 Max Martin - producer, guitar, bass, keyboards, programming, and additional background vocals (track 1)
 Tony Maserati - mixing (tracks 2-14)
 Dan Muckala - producer, engineer, keyboards, and arranging (tracks 6, 11); additional background vocals (track 11)
 Ryan Nasci - assistant mix engineer (tracks 2-14)
 Andreas Olsson - programming (tracks 3, 8), synthesizers and additional production (track 3)
 Jordan Omley - vocal production (track 9)
 Morgan Taylor Reid - producer, engineer, instruments, and programming (tracks 2, 5, 10, 12, 13)
 Tim Roberts - assistant mix engineer (track 1)
 Glen Scott - piano (tracks 3, 4, 8, 14); programming (tracks 3, 4, 14); engineer and synthesizers (tracks 4, 14); organ (track 3); Wurlitzer (track 4); producer, drums, and bass (track 14)
 Bryan Shackle - additional background vocals (track 11)
 Baeho "Bobby" Shin - strings engineer (track 3)
 Kris Sonne - drums (tracks 3, 8), percussion (track 4), programming (track 3)
 Carlos Sosa - saxophone (track 8)
 Martin Terefe - producer (tracks 3, 4, 7, 8, 14), bass (tracks 3, 7, 8), acoustic guitar  (tracks 3, 4, 8), percussion (track 8), additional programming (track 14)
 Nikolaj Torp - Hammond Organ and Wurlitzer (track 7)
 Justin Trugman - producer, instruments, and programming (track 9)
 Reggie Watkins - trombone (track 8)
 Clinton Welander - additional engineering  (tracks 3, 14)
 Kristin Wilkinson - viola (track 3)

Charts

Weekly charts

Year-end charts

Certifications

Release history

References

2013 albums
Backstreet Boys albums
Bertelsmann Music Group albums